Cook's Wood Quarry also known as Holcombe Quarry is a  geological Site of Special Scientific Interest near Stoke St Michael on the Mendip Hills in Somerset, notified in 1988.

This is a Geological Conservation Review Site. This site partially overlaps with St. Dunstan's Well Catchment SSSI.

The main exposures are cut in very steeply-dipping Carboniferous Limestone. This was the original locality for the type section of the proposed ‘Cookswoodian Stage’.

9 species of Bat, Dormice and four species of Newts including the rare Great Crested Newt reside in Cooks Wood Quarry.

Planning permission for the disused quarry has been granted to turn it into a holiday retreat.

See also 
 Quarries of the Mendip Hills

References

External links
 English Nature website (SSSI information)

Sites of Special Scientific Interest in Somerset
Sites of Special Scientific Interest notified in 1988
Quarries in the Mendip Hills